Crassula alba is a species of flowering plant in the genus Crassula found in western Africa ranging from South Africa to Sudan.

Taxonomy
Crassula alba is in the genus Crassula, family Crassulaceae and order Saxifragales.  There are two accepted infraspecies, Crassula alba var. pallida and Crassula alba var. parvisepala.

External links
 Crassula alba at Plants of the World Online

alba